was a Japanese athlete. She competed in the women's discus throw at the 1936 Summer Olympics.

References

External links
 

1916 births
Year of death missing
Place of birth missing
Japanese female discus throwers
Olympic female discus throwers
Olympic athletes of Japan
Athletes (track and field) at the 1936 Summer Olympics
Japan Championships in Athletics winners
20th-century Japanese women